Theodore Wesley Jennings Jr. (born 1942-2020), also known as Ted Jennings, was an American theologian and Methodist minister. He was Professor of Biblical and Constructive Theology at the United Church of Christ's Chicago Theological Seminary, where he had previously served as Acting Academic Dean. Jennings gained a notoriety for his work on ritual studies, the Messianic politics of Pauline discourse, and theological engagement with the work of Dietrich Bonhoeffer and Jacques Derrida.

Jennings' pro-LGBT theology was welcomed in progressive circles, but was cast as outright heretical by conservative theologians such as R. Albert Mohler, a Southern Baptist theologian and minister. This opprobrium also appeared when he published across ecumenical aisles, such as when he was called a heretic by Charlotte Allen of the non-denominational Institute on Religion and Public Life on account of his collaborations with Tat-siong Benny Liew of the College of the Holy Cross.

Biography
Jennings was born on October 24, 1942. He received his Bachelor of Arts degree from Duke University in 1964 and his Bachelor of Divinity and Doctor of Philosophy degrees from Emory University in 1967 and 1971 respectively.  He taught for three years at Seminario Metodista (Methodist Seminary) in Mexico City and is an ordained Methodist minister. His scholarly work and publications have focused on a broad array of topics, such as Methodism, ritual studies, biblical hermeneutics, liberation theology, LGBT rights and queer theology, the politics of Pauline Messianism, and the work of Jacques Derrida.

Following a serious stroke on March 5, 2020, at his second home near Acapulco, Mexico, Jennings was transported by ambulance to Hospital Angeles Roma in Mexico City where he passed away almost three weeks later on March 25, 2020.

Works by Jennings 

 An Ethic of Queer Sex: Principles and Improvisations. Exploration Press, Chicago, Illinois 2013, 
 Transforming Atonement: A Political Theology of the Cross. Fortress Press, Minneapolis 2009. 
 Plato or Paul? The Origins of Western Homophobia. Pilgrim Press, Cleveland 2009, 
 Jacob's Wound: Homoerotic Narrative in the Literature of Ancient Israel. Continuum, New York 2005, 
 Reading Derrida, Thinking Paul: On Justice. Stanford University Press, Stanford, California 2005, 
 Mistaken Identities but Model Faith: Rereading the Centurion, the Chap, and the Christ in Matthew 8:5-13. Theodore W. Jennings, Jr. and Tat-Siong Benny Liew. Journal of Biblical Literature Vol. 123, No. 3 (Autumn, 2004), pp. 467–494
 The Insurrection of the Crucified: The ‘Gospel of Mark’ as Theological Manifesto. Exploration Press, Chicago, Illinois 2003, 
 The Man Jesus Loved: Homoerotic Narratives from the New Testament. Pilgrim Press, Cleveland 2003, 
 Santidad bìblica (Seminario Metodista de Mexico), 2002
 Loyalty to God: The Apostles Creed in Life and Liturgy. Abingdon Press, Nashville 1992, 
 Good News to the Poor: John Wesley’s Evangelical Economics. Abingdon Press, Nashville 1990, 
 Beyond Theism: A Grammar of God-Language. Oxford University Press, New York 1985,

References

External links 

 Chicago Theological Seminary
 "Reading Derrida/ Thinking Paul" from Stanford University Press, 2005.Archived.
 "International Seminars of the LGBTQ Religious Studies Centers" A compilation of several international seminars with Dr. Ted Jennings on behalf of the Queer Center at CTS.
 "Outlaw Justice: The Messianic Politics of Paul" from Stanford University Press, 2013. 
 "What The Bible Really Says About Homosexuality" Lecture presented on March 24, 2009 at Hanshin Theological Seminary in Korea

1942 births
20th-century American male writers
20th-century American theologians
20th-century Methodist ministers
21st-century American male writers
21st-century American theologians
21st-century Methodist ministers
American biblical scholars
American Christian theologians
American male non-fiction writers
American United Methodist clergy
Candler School of Theology alumni
Chicago Theological Seminary faculty
Duke University alumni
Living people
Methodist theologians